Cecil — originally Cecil Station — is an unincorporated community in Taylor County, West Virginia, United States.

Cecil was named after Cecil Board in 1898 when the railroad was extended to that point. The settlement was partially evacuated — including the train station — in 1936-37 to accommodate the rising waters of Tygart Lake.

References 

Unincorporated communities in West Virginia
Unincorporated communities in Taylor County, West Virginia